Samme Givens (born August 9, 1989) is an American professional basketball player for Oberá Tenis Club of the La Liga Argentina de Básquet (LLA). He played college basketball for Drexel University before playing professionally in the Netherlands, France, Germany and Israel.

Professional career
In his first season as a professional basketball player, Givens played for Aris Leeuwarden in the Dutch Basketball League (DBL). The website Eurobasket.com named him the most valuable player of the regular season, however Givens did not win the official award. With Aris, Givens reached the league finals, after surprising top-seeded EiffelTowers Den Bosch in the semi-finals. On June 19, 2013, Givens signed with ALM Évreux Basket of the Pro B in France.

On September 15, 2015, Givens signed with the Israeli team Maccabi Ra'anana of the Liga Leumit. In his third season with Ra'anana, Givens averaged 18.3 points, 9.5 rebounds, 3.5 assists and 1.6 steals per game and earned a spot in the All-Liga Leumit Second Team by the Eurobasket.com website.

On July 3, 2018, Givens signed a two-year deal with Maccabi Haifa, joining his former head coach Barak Peleg. Givens won the 2019 Israeli National League Championship with Haifa.

On August 15, 2019, he has signed with Kauhajoki Karhu of the Korisliiga.

In the 2020–21 season, Givens played with Ravenna of the Italian Serie A2 Basket.

In the 2021–22 season, Givens played with Oberá Tenis Club of the Argentenian La Liga Argentina de Básquet (LLA).

The Basketball Tournament
In the summer of 2017, Givens played in The Basketball Tournament (TBT) on ESPN for the Broad Street Brawlers.  He competed for the $2 million prize, and for the Brawlers, he averaged 14.8 points per game while also averaging 7.5 rebounds per game.  Givens helped the Brawlers reach the second round of the tournament, losing then to Team Colorado, 111–95.

In TBT 2018, Givens suited up for the Talladega Knights. In 4 games, he averaged 11 points, 10.3 rebounds, and 1.5 steals per game. The Talladega Knights reached the Northeast Regional Championship before falling to the Golden Eagles.

Givens completed with Team Brotherly Love in the 2020 edition of the tournament.

Awards and accomplishments

Club
Maccabi Haifa
Israeli National League: (2019)

Individual
DBL Statistical Player of the Year: (2013)

References

External links
Eurobasket.com profile
Profile at draftexpress.com
ESPN.com profile
RealGM profile

1989 births
Living people
ALM Évreux Basket players
American expatriate basketball people in France
American expatriate basketball people in Germany
American expatriate basketball people in Israel
American expatriate basketball people in the Netherlands
American men's basketball players
Aris Leeuwarden players
Basketball players from Philadelphia
Drexel Dragons men's basketball players
Dutch Basketball League players
Maccabi Haifa B.C. players
Maccabi Ra'anana players
Power forwards (basketball)
S.Oliver Würzburg players
Small forwards